C.S. Volei 2004 Tomis Constanța, commonly known as 2004 Tomis Constanța, was a professional women's volleyball club based in Constanța, Romania. It played in the 2012–13 CEV Women's Champions League season.

Honours

National competitions
  Romanian Championship: 2
2010–11, 2011–12
Runner-up: 2009, 2010

  Romanian Cup: 1
2010–11

International competitions
  CEV Cup (Final-four)
  Third (1): 2011–12

Notable former players

See also 
 C.V.M. Tomis Constanța (Men's team)

References

External links
Official Website 

Romanian volleyball clubs
Sport in Constanța